Harry Eltringham FRS (18 May 1873, South Shields – 26 November 1941, Stroud) was an English histologist and entomologist who specialised in Lepidoptera.

Life 
He had been awarded a Master of Science (Cantab and Oxon) and a Doctor of Science (Oxon).

He worked at the Hope Department of Entomology. He wrote Histological and Illustrative Methods for Entomologists , The Senses of Insects, London, Methuen (1933) and on Lepidoptera Nymphalidae: Subfamily Acraeinae. Lepidopterorum Catalogus 11:1-65 with Karl Jordan (1913) and On specific and mimetic relationships in the genus Heliconius.

Eltringham was the author of a photograph of Edward Bagnall Poulton taken through the compound eye of a glowworm.

He was an elected a Fellow of the Royal Entomological Society (President 1931-32)  and in May, 1930 the Royal Society.

References 

English lepidopterists
1873 births
1941 deaths
Fellows of the Royal Entomological Society
Fellows of the Royal Society
People from South Shields
Histologists